Statistics of the Scottish Football League in season 1917–18. The competition was won by Rangers by one point over nearest rival Celtic.

League table

Results

See also
1917–18 in Scottish football

References

 
1917-18